The Ambracian Gulf, also known as the Gulf of Arta or the Gulf of Actium, and in some official documents as the Amvrakikos Gulf, is a gulf of the Ionian Sea in northwestern Greece. The towns of Preveza, Amphilochia (formerly Karvassaras), and Vonitsa lie on its shores.

Name
The gulf takes its name from the ancient city of Ambracia located near its shores.  Its alternative name comes from the medieval (and modern) city of Arta, located in the same place as ancient Ambracia.

Geography

The entrance to the gulf is through a -wide channel between Aktio (ancient Actium) on the south and Preveza on the north; a recent road tunnel connects the two. The gulf is quite shallow, and its northern shore is broken by numerous marshes, large parts of which form an estuary system.  The Louros and Arachthos (or Arta) rivers drain into it; for this reason it is warmer and less salty than the Ionian, and a current flows from the gulf into the sea. It is rich in grey mullet, sole, and eel, and is also very famous for the local variety of large shrimp (gabari, in Greek γάμπαρη). Sea turtles and dolphins regularly make an appearance, while it contains lagoons very important for birds.

History
The Ambracian Gulf was the site of the Battle of Actium, in which Augustus' forces defeated those of Mark Antony and Cleopatra. From Greek independence (Treaty of Constantinople, 1832) until the Second Balkan War (Treaty of Bucharest, 1913), the gulf formed part of the border between the Kingdom of Greece and the Ottoman Empire.

The remains of numerous ancient cities lie on its shores: Actium at the entrance, where the famous Battle of Actium was fought in 31 BC; Nicopolis, Argos Ippatum, Limnaea, and Olpae.

Ecology 
The Ambracian gulf is one site in the EU 'life transfer' project restoring seagrass meadows to combat climate change and enrich biodiversity

Transportation
Since 2002, the northern and southern sides at the mouth of the gulf are connected by the Aktio-Preveza Undersea Tunnel.  The tunnel greatly shortens the travel distance across the gulf, which used to be possible only by ferry. The Aktion International Airport (airport code PVK) is built near the Gulf's entrance and serves the region.

References

Notes

James Wolfe, "Observations on the Gulf of Arta, Made in 1830" Journal of the Royal Geographical Society of London 3:77-94 (1833) at JSTOR

External links
Preveza Weather Station SV6GMQ - Live Weather Conditions (in English and Greek)

Gulfs of Greece
Gulfs of the Ionian Sea
Ramsar sites in Greece
Landforms of Preveza (regional unit)
Landforms of Epirus (region)
Landforms of Aetolia-Acarnania
Landforms of Western Greece